Gabriel Nuchelmans (15 May 1922, Oud Gastel – 6 August 1996, Wassenaar) was a Dutch philosopher, focusing on the history of philosophy, especially philosophy of the Middle Ages, as well as logic and philosophy of language.

Biography
After completing high school at the Episcopal School of Roermond, Nuchelmans studied at the Catholic University of Nijmegen, where he earned his PhD in 1947. During the PhD he spent a year in Freiburg/Switzerland with Olof Gigon and Joseph Maria Bocheński. In 1947/48 he attended courses by Alfred Ayer and Stuart Hampshire, at University College London. He also heard, at the London School of Economics, Karl Popper and O. J. Wisdom. After admission to the PhD Nuchelmans taught for fourteen years Latin and Greek in Velsen. From 1964 he taught Ancient Philosophy and Analytic Philosophy and its History at the Philosophical Institute of the University of Leiden until  his retirement on 10 September 1987. In this occasion a volume of essays (Logos and Pragma) was dedicated to him to celebrate his scholarly achievements. Nuchelmans had since 1975 been a member of the Koninklijke Nederlandse Akademie van Wetenschappen. His great work in three volumes on the history of the theories of proposition (1973, 1980, 1983) will remain for a long time the standard work on the subject.

Selected publications
 Theories of the Proposition. Ancient and Medieval Conceptions of the Bearers of Truth and Falsity, North-Holland, Amsterdan/London 1973, 
 Late-Scholastic and Humanist Theories of the Proposition, North-Holland, Amsterdam/London 1980, 
 Judgement and proposition. From Descartes to Kant, North-Holland, Amsterdam/London 1983, 
 Geulincx Containment Theory of Logic, (Mededelingen Der Koninklijke Nederlandse Akademie Van Wetenschappen, Afd. Letterkunde), Royal Netherlands Academy of Arts & Sciences 1988, 
 Dilemmatic Arguments. Towards a History of Their Logic and Rhetoric, North-Holland, Amsterdam/London 1991, 
 Secundum/Tertium Adiacens Vicissitudes of a Logical Distinction, (Mededelingen Der Koninklijke Nederlandse Akademie Van Wetenschappen, Afd. Letterkunde), Royal Netherlands Academy of Arts & Sciences 1992, 
 Studies in the History of Logic and Semantics, 12th – 17th Century, edited durch E.P. Bos, Variorum, Aldershot 1996 (reprint of 17 essays) (online)
 Logic in the Seventeenth Century. Preliminary Remarks and the Constituents of the Proposition, The Cambridge History of Seventeenth-century Philosophy. Edited by Daniel Garber and Michael R. Ayers. Cambridge: Cambridge University Press 1998. pp. 103–117
 Proposition and Judgement, The Cambridge History of Seventeenth-century Philosophy. Edited by Daniel Garber and Michael R. Ayers. Cambridge: Cambridge University Press 1998. pp. 118–131
 Deductive Reasoning, The Cambridge History of Seventeenth-century Philosophy. Edited by Daniel Garber and Michael R. Ayers. Cambridge: Cambridge University Press 1998. pp. 132–146

References

Sources
 L. M. de Rijk, H. A. G. Braakhuis (eds.): Logos and Pragma. Essays on the Philosophy of Language in Honour of Professor Gabriel Nuchelmans Nijmegen, Ingenium Publishers, 1987 (with a bibliography of his works (1950–1987)
 L. M. de Rijk, Biography (in Dutch)

1922 births
1996 deaths
20th-century Dutch philosophers
Dutch logicians
Dutch historians of philosophy
Radboud University Nijmegen alumni
Alumni of University College London
Academic staff of Leiden University
Members of the Royal Netherlands Academy of Arts and Sciences
People from Halderberge
20th-century  Dutch historians
Dutch expatriates in Switzerland
Dutch expatriates in the United Kingdom